Seydelia is a genus of moths in the family Erebidae from the Afrotropics. The genus was described by Sergius G. Kiriakoff in 1952.

Species 
 Seydelia ellioti (Butler, 1896)
 Seydelia geometrica (Oberthür, 1883)
 Seydelia turlini Toulgoët, 1976
 Seydelia turlini celsicola Toulgoët, 1976

Former species 
 Seydelia kostlani (Gaede, 1923)
 Seydelia melaena (Hampson, 1901)
 Seydelia melaenoides (Rothschild, 1935)

References

Spilosomina
Moth genera